Hawaiian religion refers to the indigenous religious beliefs and practices of native Hawaiians, also known as the kapu system. Hawaiian religion is based largely on the tapu religion common in Polynesia and likely originated among the Tahitians and other Pacific islanders who landed in Hawaii between 500 and 1300 AD.  It is polytheistic and animistic, with a belief in many deities and spirits, including the belief that spirits are found in non-human beings and objects such as other animals, the waves, and the sky. It was only during the reign of Kamehameha I that a ruler from Hawaii island attempted to impose a singular "Hawaiian" religion on all the Hawaiian islands that was not Christianity.

Today, Hawaiian religious practices are protected by the American Indian Religious Freedom Act. Traditional Hawaiian religion is unrelated to the modern New Age practice known as "Huna".

Beliefs

Deities

 

Hawaiian religion is polytheistic, with many deities, most prominently Kāne, Kū, Lono and Kanaloa. Other notable deities include Laka, Kihawahine, Haumea, Papahānaumoku, and, most famously, Pele. In addition, each family is considered to have one or more guardian spirits known as ʻaumakua that protected family.

One breakdown of the Hawaiian pantheon consists of the following groups:
 the four gods – Kū, Kāne, Lono, and Kanaloa
 the forty male gods or aspects of Kāne
 the four hundred gods and goddesses
 the great multitude of gods and goddesses
 the spirits
 the guardians

Another breakdown consists of three major groups:
 the four gods, or akua: Kū, Kāne, Lono, Kanaloa
 many lesser gods, or kupua, each associated with certain professions
 guardian spirits, or aumakua, associated with particular families

Atheism
Not all ancient Hawaiian believed in deities. Some ancient Hawaiians were atheists, referred to as 'aia'.

Creation
One Hawaiian creation myth is embodied in the Kumulipo, an epic chant linking the alii, or Hawaiian royalty, to the gods. This, in turn, illustrates the transition of mankind from being symbols for the gods (the literal meaning of ) into the keeper of these symbols in the form of idols and the like. The Kumulipo was recited during the time of Makahiki, to honor the god of fertility, Lono.

Kahuna and Kapu

Selected to serve many practical and governmental purposes,  often were healers, navigators, builders, prophets/temple workers, and philosophers.

They also talked with the spirits. Prayers were said.
Then, "If the evil spirit suddenly appears and possesses the patient, then he or she can be immediately saved by the conversation between the practitioner and that spirit."

Pukui and others believed kahuna did not have mystical transcendent experiences as described in other religions. Although a person who was possessed would go into a trance-like state, it was not an ecstatic experience but simply a communion with the known spirits.

 refers to a system of taboos designed to separate the spiritually pure from the potentially unclean.  Thought to have arrived with Pāao, a priest or chief from Tahiti who arrived in Hawaii sometime around 1200 AD, the  imposed a series of restrictions on daily life.  Prohibitions included:
 The separation of men and women during mealtimes (a restriction known as )
 Restrictions on the gathering and preparation of food
 Women separated from the community during their menses
 Restrictions on looking at, touching, or being in close proximity with chiefs and individuals of known spiritual power
 Restrictions on overfishing

 The use of a different ovens to cook the food for men and women
 Different eating places
 Women were forbidden to eat pig, coconut, banana, and certain red foods because of their male symbolism.

 During times of war, the first two men to be killed were offered to the gods as sacrifices.
Tradition says that  originated from the first child of Wākea and Hoohokukalani being deformed so they buried him in the ground and what sprouted became the first , also known as taro. The Hawaiian islands are all children of Papa, Wākea and Hoohokukalani so basically meaning that they are older siblings of the Hawaiian chiefs. Second child of Wākea and Hoohokukalani became the first , or "Grand Chief". This came to be called , the chiefly incest to create the "godly child".

No baby could cry, dog howl, or rooster crow, on pain of death.

Human sacrifice was not unknown. 

The  system remained in place until 1819 (see below).

Prayer and 

Prayer was an essential part of Hawaiian life, employed when building a house, making a canoe, and giving lomilomi massage.  Hawaiians addressed prayers to various gods depending on the situation.  When healers picked herbs for medicine, they usually prayed to Kū and Hina, male and female, right and left, upright and supine. The people worshiped Lono during  season and Kū during times of war.

Histories from the 19th century describe prayer throughout the day, with specific prayers associated with mundane activities such as sleeping, eating, drinking, and traveling.  However, it has been suggested that the activity of prayer differed from the subservient styles of prayer often seen in the Western world:

 served as focal points for prayer in Hawaii.

History

Origins

Although it is unclear when settlers first came to the Hawaiian Islands, there is significant evidence that the islands were settled no later than 800 AD and immigration continued to about 1300 AD. Settlers came from the Marquesas and greater Polynesia. At some point, a significant influx of Tahitian settlers landed on the Hawaiian islands, bringing with them their religious beliefs.

Early Hawaiian religion resembled other Polynesian religions in that it was largely focused on natural forces such as the tides, the sky, and volcanic activity as well as man's dependence on nature for subsistence.  The major early gods reflected these characteristics, as the early Hawaiians worshiped Kāne (the god of the sky and creation), Kū (the god of war and male pursuits), Lono (the god of peace, rain, and fertility) and Kanaloa (the god of the ocean).

Early Hawaiian religion
As an Indigenous culture, spread among eight islands, with waves of immigration over hundreds of years from various parts of the South Pacific, religious practices evolved over time and from place to place in different ways.

Hawaiian scholar Mary Kawena Pukui, who was raised in Kaʻū, Hawaii, maintained that the early Hawaiian gods were benign. One Molokai tradition follows this line of thought. Author and researcher Pali Jae Lee writes: "During these ancient times, the only 'religion' was one of family and oneness with all things. They respected all things and took care of all things.

"In the dominant current of Western thought there is a fundamental separation between humanity and divinity. ... In many other cultures, however, such differences between human and divine do not exist.  Some peoples have no concept of a ‘Supreme Being’ or ‘Creator God’ who is by nature ‘other than’ his creation.  They do, however, claim to experience a spirit world in which beings more powerful than they are concerned for them and can be called upon for help."

"Along with ancestors and gods, spirits are part of the family of Hawaiians. "There are many kinds of spirits that help for good and many that aid in evil.  Some lie and deceive, and some are truthful ... It is a wonderful thing how the spirits ( of the dead and the ‘angels’ of the  can possess living persons.  Nothing is impossible to god-spirits, ."

Contemporary

King Kamehameha the Great died in 1819. They convinced young Liholiho, Kamehameha II, to  overthrow the  system. They ordered the people to burn the wooden statues and to tear down the rock temples.

Without the hierarchical system of religion in place, some abandoned the old gods, and others continued with cultural traditions of worshipping them, especially their family .

Protestant Christian  missionaries  arrived from the United States from 1820 onwards, and eventually gained great political, moral and economic influence in the Kingdom of Hawaii. Most of the  converted to Christianity, including Kaahumanu and Keōpūolani, but it took 11 years for Kaahumanu to proclaim laws against ancient religious practices: 

Despite the outlawing of traditional Hawaiian religious practices, a number of traditions  survived by integration, through practice in hiding, or through practice in rural communities in the islands. Hula, at one time outlawed as a religious practice, today is performed in both spiritual and secular contexts.

Traditional beliefs have also played a role in the politics of post-contact Hawaii. In the 1970s the Hawaiian religion experienced a resurgence during the Hawaiian Renaissance. In 1976 members of a group "Protect Kahoolawe Ohana" filed suit in federal court over the use of  Kahoolawe by the United States Navy for target practice. Charging that the practice disturbed important cultural and religious sites Aluli et al. v. Brown forced the Navy to survey and protect important sites, perform conservation activities, and allow limited access to the island for religious purposes. Similarly, outrage over the unearthing of 1,000 graves (dating back to 850 AD) during the construction of a Ritz-Carlton hotel on Maui in 1988 resulted in the redesign and relocation of the hotel inland, as well as the appointment of the site as a state historic place.
Since 2014 an ongoing series of protests and demonstrations have taken place on the Island of Hawaii regarding the choosing of Mauna Kea for the site location of the Thirty Meter Telescope.  These protests have become known as the Thirty Meter Telescope Protests. Some Hawaiians regard Mauna Kea as the most sacred mountain of Native Hawaiian religion and culture. Native Hawaiian cultural practitioners have repeatedly failed in court to prove that these practices predate 1893 (the threshold for protection under Hawaii State law). Protests began locally within the state of Hawaii on October 7, 2014, but went global within weeks of the April 2, 2015, arrest of 31 people who had blockaded the roadway to keep construction crews off the summit.  On July 14, 2019, an online petition titled 
"The Immediate Halt to the Construction of the TMT telescope on Mauna Kea" was posted on Change.org. The petition has gathered over 100,000 signatures.

Along with the surviving traditions, some Hawaiians practice  Christianized versions of old traditions.  Others practice the old faith as a co-religion.

In the 1930s, non-Hawaiian author Max Freedom Long originated a philosophy and practice which he called  "Huna". While Long and his successors represent this invention as a type of ancient Hawaiian occultism, non-Hawaiian scholars Rothstein and  Chai consider it a New Age mix of cultural appropriation and fantasy, and not representative of traditional Hawaiian religion.

References

Further reading and resources

 
Animism
Polytheism